Ivano-Frankivsk is the main station of the Ivano-Frankivsk directory of Lviv Railways.

History
The railway station in Ivano-Frankivsk was established in 1866 when the city of Stanislau was part of the Kingdom of Galicia and Lodomeria within the Austro-Hungary. It became one of the oldest train stations in Ukraine. The station was built as part of the expansion of the Galician Railway of Archduke Charles Louis from Lemberg (Lviv) towards Czernowitz (Chernivtsi). Along with the station right next to it was found a machine maintenance shop that later was transformed into a steam locomotive maintenance shop.

The terminal of the station was built using elements of the Mauritanian style. The first train that traveled from Lemberg to Czernowitz stopped at Stanislau on September 1, 1866. In 1894 Stanislau became the district center of the Austrian State Railways. The railways terminal became the first city's structure in Ivano-Frankivsk that was electrified on January 13, 1897. The electricity was installed by the German company out of Berlin Siemens & Halske.

From 1903 through 1906 under the leadership of the Vienna architect E.Baudisch, the terminal was expanded. A railway post office was built nearby.

Trains
 Ivano-Frankivsk – Kyiv
 Ivano-Frankivsk – Kharkiv
 Ivano-Frankivsk – Novooleksiivka

References

External links
 Ivano-Frankivsk station at railwayz.info (photos) 
 Visit card of the terminal 

!Previous station!!!!Operator!!!!Next Station

Buildings and structures in Ivano-Frankivsk
Railway stations in Ivano-Frankivsk Oblast
Lviv Railways stations